Sandawe is a language spoken by about 60,000 Sandawe people in the Dodoma Region of Tanzania. Sandawe's use of click consonants, a rare feature shared with only two other languages of East Africa – Hadza and Dahalo, had been the basis of its classification as a member of the defunct Khoisan family of Southern Africa since Albert Drexel in the 1920s. Recent investigations however (Güldemann 2010) suggest that Sandawe may be related to the Khoe family regardless of the validity of Khoisan as a whole. A discussion of Sandawe's linguistic classification can be found in Sands (1998).

Language use is vigorous among both adults and children, with people in some areas monolingual. Sandawe has two dialects, northwest and southeast. Differences include speaking speed, vowel dropping, some word taboo, and minor lexical and grammatical differences. Some Alagwa have shifted to Sandawe, and are considered a Sandawe clan.

SIL International began work on Sandawe in 1996 and to date (2004), Daniel and Elisabeth Hunziker and Helen Eaton continue to work on the analysis of the language. They have so far produced a phonological description, a dialect survey report and several papers on aspects of grammar. Sandawe is also currently (since 2002) studied by Sander Steeman of Leiden University.

Phonology

Vowels

Sandawe has five vowel qualities:

All five vowel qualities may be found as short oral, long oral and long nasal vowels. There are therefore fifteen basic vowel phonemes. Short nasal vowels also occur, apparently from the historical elision of a nasal consonant that is still attested in related forms. Long vowels are written double, aa, and long nasal vowels with a tilde, ã.

Long vowels are about 50% longer than short vowels. In morpheme-final position, low-tone /u/ and /i/ are frequently devoiced, though this may not occur after /j/, /w/, or /h/.

Consonants

Non-click consonants

Clicks

The clicks in Sandawe are not particularly loud, when compared to better known click languages in southern Africa. The lateral click  can be confused with the alveolar lateral ejective affricate  even by native speakers. With the postalveolar clicks, the tongue often slaps the bottom of the mouth, and this slap may be louder than the actual release of the click. Wright et al. transcribe this slapped click with the extended-IPA symbol . The voiced clicks are uncommon, being found in a few words such as gqokomi 'greater kudu' and gcingco (sp. bird). Labialized clicks are found in word-initial position.

The glottalized click phonation is something like creaky voice, not an ejective. In initial position, the glottis is closed during the entire occlusion of the click, and not opened until after the release burst. In medial position, the glottis is closed after the velar closure  and before the forward closure, but opened before the click release.

The practical orthography is based on Xhosa and Zulu.

Tone
Hunziker et al. (2008) transcribe seven phonetic tones: high , mid , low , high falling , mid falling , low falling , and rising  (on long vowels only). In Sandawe orthography, they are written as exactly with their IPA spelling, but the rising tone is marked as ǎ.

High and low tones are analyzed as the basic tone configurations. However, the high-falling tone is contrastive, for example in  'water', but it also occurs often due to a sequence of tones. The mid tone does not occur initially. Hunziker et al. analyze it as a downstepped high tone: //H-L-H// is realized as [H-H-M]. This rightward shift on the tones is a general process in Sandawe. This analysis requires the assumption of floating low tones carried by consonant clusters, and thought to reflect a historical vowel which has been deleted. The low and mid falling tones are a prosodic effect, found on final syllables, or on penultimate syllables followed by a voiceless vowel; this leftward shift of tone before voiceless vowels (which by their nature cannot carry tone) is another general process of Sandawe. Rising tone is only found on long vowels and can be analyzed as a low-high sequence.

Phonotactics
The majority of Sandawe syllables are CV. Morpheme-initially, consonant clusters are of the form Cw; these are not found in the middle of morphemes. Most consonants are attested in this Cw sequence apart from the labials, the glottals (ʼ, h), sonorants (r, l, y, w), and the rather infrequent consonants n, d, dl, & the voiced clicks, which may simply be gaps in attestation. The rounded vowels o, u are not found after Cw sequences. Vowel initial syllables, as in cèú 'buffalo', are not found initially, though initial glottal stop is not written (íóó  'mother').

Glottal stops  are found as syllable codas, though these may be released in an echo vowel in some circumstances. Hunziker et al. prefer to analyze these are final consonants, because the quality of the echo vowel is predictable, and otherwise this is the only place where the vowels /e a o/ would have voiceless allophones.

Hunziker et al. find complementary distribution between homorganic NC clusters, which occur only medially (there are no word-final nasal consonants), and nasal vowels, which they only transcribe word finally. It would therefore seem that NC clusters are the realization of a preceding nasal vowel.

Other final consonants are found as consonant clusters in the middle of a word. Historically, these are presumably due to vowel elision, as evidenced by records from the early 20th century and also by tone patterns. In the northwestern dialect, words are found with final consonants where tonal patterns suggest there was once a voiceless final vowel, and where the southeastern dialect retains a voiceless i or u.

Grammar

Pronouns

Syllable structure
Sandawe syllables are usually of the form CV; in monosyllabic words, word-final nasals are not uncommon, CV(N). Sometimes other consonants are found in word-final position, but this is most probably the result of deletion of word-final voiceless vowels.

A syllabic nasal m is found in Swahili loanwords. The most common word structure is disyllabic with or without long vowels (CV(ː)CV(ː)), according to De Voogt (1992).

Nouns
Although nouns can be masculine or feminine, there is usually no particular marker that indicates the gender. Many singular feminine human nouns are marked by the ending -sù, whereas some singular masculine human nouns end in -é. Additionally, definite human feminine nouns must be marked with the suffix -sù, often repeating marking:

Gender assignment for most non-human animates as well as inanimates is largely unpredictable. However, according to Steeman (2011), all body parts are masculine, bigger plants are masculine while smaller plants are feminine, machinery nouns new to the Sandawe (whose names are typically borrowed from Swahili) are usually feminine, and deverbal nouns representing acts (nominalizations) are masculine. According to Eaton (2010), a masculine noun can be made a diminutive by treating it as a feminine noun.

According to Eaton (2010), definite plural nouns are marked with the suffix -khéé, while definite associative plurals are marked with the suffix -khì. According to Steeman (2011), definite human plurals are marked with -sò.

Adjectives
The same roots may be used as adjectives or verbs according to Kagaya (1993:ix).

Syntax
Basic word order in Sandawe is SOV according to De Voogt (1992). However, word order in the Sandawe sentence is very flexible due to the presence of several 'subject identification strategies'.

Sample sentence (mid tones are not marked):

An article in Studies in African Linguistics, Volume 10, Number 3, 1979, by Gerard Dalgish, describes these 'subject identification strategies' in detail. Numerous permutations of sentence constituents are allowed in certain tenses, the pattern being: (a) the first constituent is the subject or (b) any non-subject that is first in the sentence must be marked for the subject. Non-subject constituents include verbs, a progressive marker, objects, indirect objects, adverbs, prepositional phrases, complementizers. Similar results are obtained in WH-Questions.

Tone
Elderkin (1989) analyzes Sandawe as having two level tones (High, Low) and two contour tones (Falling, Rising). His thesis considers the behavior of tone at word-, sentence- and discourse-level. De Voogt (1992) and Kagaya (1993) list three level tones (High, Mid, Low) and two contour tones (Falling, Rising).

Classification

The most promising candidate as a relative of Sandawe are the Khoe languages of Botswana and Namibia. Most of the putative cognates Greenberg (1976) gives as evidence for Sandawe being a Khoisan language in fact tie Sandawe to Khoe. Gueldemann and Elderkin have strengthened that connection, with several dozen likely cognates, while casting doubts on other Khoisan connections. Although there are not enough similarities to reconstruct a Proto-Khoe–Sandawe language, there are enough to suggest that the connection is real. However, other linguists have criticized the proposal as cherry-picking among a large number of non-matching pronominal forms.

The pronominal system is quite similar: 

These may cast some light on the development of clicks. For example, the Sandawe word for 'horn', tlana, may be a cognate with the root nǁâ found throughout the Khoe family. This and other words suggests that clicks may form from consonant clusters when the first vowel of a word is lost: *tlana > *tlna > ǁna (nǁa).

Another word common to Sandawe and Khoe, the numeral haka 'four', is also found in the neighboring Cushitic languages Aasax and Kwʼadza, and was perhaps borrowed into them from Sandawe.

Since the Khoe family appears to have migrated to southern Africa from the northeast, it may be that Sandawe is closer to their common homeland than the modern Khoe languages are.

See also
Click language
Hadza language
Khoisan languages

References

Bibliography
Dalgish, Gerard (1979) "Subject Identification Strategies and Free Word Order: The Case of Sandawe" in Studies in African Linguistics, Volume 10, Number 3, pp. 273–310
Dobashi, Yoshihito (2001) "Agreement and Word Order in Sandawe" In Cornell Working Papers in Linguistics, 18, pp. 57–74
Eaton, Helen C. (2002) A Grammar of Focus in Sandawe (unpublished Ph.D. thesis, University of Reading)
 

Elderkin, Edward D. (1989) The Significance and Origin of the Use of Pitch in Sandawe (Unpublished D.Phil. thesis, University of York).
Güldemann, Tom and Edward D. Elderkin (2010) "On external genealogical relationships of the Khoe family.". In: Brenzinger, Matthias and Christa König (eds.), Khoisan languages and linguistics: the Riezlern symposium 2003. Quellen zur Khoisan-Forschung 17. Köln: Rüdiger Köppe.
Hunziker, Daniel, Elisabeth Hunziker, & Helen Eaton (2008) A Description of the Phonology of the Sandawe Language. SIL Electronic Working Papers 
Kagaya, Ryohei (1993) "A Classified Vocabulary of The Sandawe Language", Asian & African Lexicon vol 26. Tokyo: Institute for the Study of Languages and Cultures of Asia and Africa (ILCAA).
Sands, Bonny E. (1998) Eastern and Southern African Khoisan: evaluating claims of distant linguistic relationships. Quellen zur Khoisan-Forschung 14. Köln: Köppe.
Steeman, Sander (2011) A Grammar of Sandawe: A Khoisan Language from Tanzania, Utrecht: Landelijke Onderzoekschool Taalwetenschap.
Voogt, A.J. de (1992) Some phonetic aspects of Hatsa and Sandawe clicks (Unpublished MA thesis in African Linguistics, Leiden University).
Wright, Richard, Ian Maddieson, Peter Ladefoged, Bonny Sands (1995). "A phonetic study of Sandawe clicks", UCLA Working Papers in Phonetics, No. 91: Fieldwork Studies in Targeted Languages III.

External links
 Sandawe wordlists and accompanying soundfiles at UCLA
Helen Eaton More information on SIL International's work on Sandawe, with papers for downloading.
 Sandawe basic lexicon at the Global Lexicostatistical Database

Khoisan languages
Languages of Tanzania
Language isolates of Africa
Tonal languages
Click languages